Sandy Beach is a beach on the South Shore of Oahu in Hawaii. It is known for its excellent bodyboarding and bodysurfing opportunities due to shore break and consistent barrels. Consequently, more injuries occur per year at Sandy Beach than any other beach in Hawaii, earning it the infamous nickname, "break-neck" beach. The water is especially dangerous during high surf, when strong rip currents are present. The beach park is located between Hanauma Bay Nature Preserve Park on the west and Makapuu Point on east along 8800 Kalanianaole Highway in Honolulu's southside neighborhood.

In October 2014, Honolulu City Council member Stanley Chang proposed changing the name of Sandy Beach to "President Barack Obama Sandy Beach Park." The plans were dropped due to opposition from the public.

References

External links

Surfing locations in Hawaii
Big wave surfing
Beaches of Oahu